The gens Burriena was a Roman family during the late Republic.  It is known chiefly from a single individual, Gaius Burrienus, praetor urbanus about 82 B.C.

See also
 List of Roman gentes

References

Roman gentes